Events in the year 2012 in Belgium.

Incumbents
Monarch: Albert II
Prime Minister: Elio Di Rupo

Events
February
 3 to 4 February – The traffic record is broken in Belgium due to excessive snowfall, 1,275 kilometres of traffic.

March
 13 March – Sierre coach crash: a bus with Belgian and Dutch schoolchildren crashes in a tunnel near Sierre, Switzerland, killing 28 and injuring 24.
 16 March – National day of mourning for the victims of the Sierre coach crash.

June
 7 June – King Albert II of Belgium opens the 25N railway line.

September
 17 September – Flemish commercial TV channel VT4 relaunched as VIER.

October
 14 October – Provincial and municipal elections take place.
 24 October – Announcement that Ford Genk would close at the end of 2013 or the beginning of 2014, leaving 4,300 unemployed.
 27 October – Five Belgians die in a bus accident in Kerak, Jordan.

December
 9 December – The Benelux train serving Amsterdam and Brussels is replaced by the Fyra high speed train.

Sports
 24 March – The team K.S.C. Lokeren Oost-Vlaanderen wins the 2011–12 Belgian Cup.
 6 May – Anderlecht win the Belgian Pro League after a home draw against Club Brugge.
 2 September – Jenson Button wins the 2012 Belgian Grand Prix at Circuit de Spa-Francorchamps.
 7 October – Joseph Mutai wins the Brussels Marathon in 2:16.41.
 25–27 August – Ellen van Dijk wins 2012 Lotto-Decca Tour

Deaths
 5 May – Jacques Stiennon (born 1920), historian
 24 December – Xavier Mabille (born 1933), historian and political scientist

See also
2012 in Belgian television

References

 
Belgium
Years of the 21st century in Belgium
2010s in Belgium
Belgium